Miguel Angel Ayala Valladares (born 26 July 1981) was a Chilean footballer.

Honours

Player
Deportes Iquique
 Primera B de Chile (1): 2010
 Copa Chile (1): 2010

References
 Profile at BDFA 
 

1981 births
Living people
Chilean footballers
Curicó Unido footballers
Deportes Linares footballers
Deportes Iquique footballers
Deportes Concepción (Chile) footballers
Rangers de Talca footballers
Chilean Primera División players
Primera B de Chile players
Association football defenders
People from Talca